Crimean War (1853–1856) was a conflict between Russia and the alliance of France, Britain, the Ottoman Empire, and Sardinia.

Wars and conflicts involving Crimea include:
Genoese–Mongol Wars (13th–15th centuries)
Crimean-Nogai Raids (1468–1769), slave raids on Russia and greater Poland organized by the Crimean Khanate
Russo-Crimean Wars (16th century) between Russia and the Crimean Khanate
Crimean campaigns of 1687 and 1689, part of these wars
Polish-Ottoman Wars (15th to 17th centuries), often included Crimea
Crimean Campaign (1941–1942), a World War II German offensive
Crimean Offensive (1944), a World War II Soviet offensive
Annexation of Crimea by the Russian Federation (2014), a part of the Russo-Ukrainian war

See also

 Crimea (disambiguation)
 War (disambiguation)